Hemlata Chaudhary (born 30 December 1969) is an Indian politician and a member of the 16th Legislative Assembly of Uttar Pradesh of India. She represents the Bagpat constituency of Uttar Pradesh and is a member of the Bahujan Samaj Party political party.

Early life and  education
Hemlata Chaudhary  was born in Meerut district, Uttar Pradesh in a Gurjar family. Her father Inder deo Singh is a Retd. Deputy Superintendent in Uttar Pradesh Police. She attended the Chaudhary Charan Singh University and attained Bachelor of Education  & Master of Arts and currently studying Indian law. She has been a history teacher before joining politics.

Political career
Hemlata Chaudhary is the wife of former Member of Legislative Council Prashant Chaudhary. She has been a MLA for one term. She represented the Bagpat constituency and is a member of the Bahujan Samaj Party political party.

Posts held

See also
Bagpat (Assembly constituency)
Sixteenth Legislative Assembly of Uttar Pradesh
Uttar Pradesh Legislative Assembly

References 

Bahujan Samaj Party politicians from Uttar Pradesh
Uttar Pradesh MLAs 2012–2017
People from Bagpat district
1969 births
Living people